NewsOnline Nigeria is an independent online newspaper based in Nigeria.

History 
The Newspaper, published by Winner’s Media Concept was established in 2020. In 2021, the newspaper moved its operations to Lagos.

Newsonline Nigeria was founded by Mr Mmadubugwu Nonso Justice, who serves as chairman and editor-in-chief of the NewsOnline Nigeria.

Project
Newsonline Nigeria partnered Rotary for PAD A GIRL 2.0 Campaign project held in Ntezi, Ebonyi State, Nigeria.

Awards 
The founder and editor-in-chief of NewsOnline Nigeria was selected among the 30 Anambra under 35 CEOs for special recognition in the celebration of Anambra at 30.

References

External links 
 

2020 establishments in Nigeria
Publications established in 2020
Companies based in Lagos
Newspapers published in Lagos
English-language newspapers published in Africa
Online newspapers published in Nigeria